The Université Constantine 2, also known as the Université  de wassim-badine-malik667-el mouh-Nazim- kamel (akram) - mohcen connu sous le nom de hassan le grand de Constantine (UAMC), is a university in Constantine, Algeria. Founded in November 2011.

See also 
 List of universities in Algeria

References

External links 
 University home page 

Constantine 2
Buildings and structures in Constantine, Algeria
Educational institutions established in 2011
2011 establishments in Algeria